

David Baker (born October 6, 1962, in Seattle, Washington) is an American biochemist and computational biologist who has pioneered methods to predict and design the three-dimensional structures of proteins. He is the Henrietta and Aubrey Davis Endowed Professor in Biochemistry and an adjunct professor of Genome Sciences, Bioengineering, Chemical Engineering, Computer Science, and Physics at the University of Washington. He serves as the Director of the Rosetta Commons, a consortium of labs and researchers that develop biomolecular structure prediction and design software. The problem of protein structure prediction to which Baker has contributed significantly has now been largely solved by DeepMind using artificial intelligence. Baker is a Howard Hughes Medical Institute investigator and a member of the United States National Academy of Sciences. He is also the director of the University of Washington's Institute for Protein Design.

Life
Baker did his graduate work in biochemistry at the University of California, Berkeley in the laboratory of Randy Schekman, where he worked predominantly on protein transport and trafficking in yeast. He did his postdoctoral work with David Agard of University of California, San Francisco.

For his work on protein folding, Baker received the 2008 Sackler International Prize in Biophysics, the 2021 Breakthrough Prize in Life Sciences, and in 2022 the Wiley Prize. For 2022 he was awarded the BBVA Foundation Frontiers of Knowledge Award in the category "Biology and Biomedicine".

Baker was elected a Fellow of the American Academy of Arts and Sciences in 2009. He is married to Hannele Ruohola-Baker, another biochemist at UW. They have two children.

Career 
Baker's group developed the Rosetta algorithm for ab initio protein structure prediction, which has been extended to a distributed computing project called Rosetta@Home and Foldit. The project aims to produce structural models for protein complexes as well as individual polypeptide chains. The group specializes in the CASP structure prediction experiment using ab initio methods, including both manually assisted and automated variants of the Rosetta protocol.

Members of his group are  active in the field of protein design; they are noted  for designing a protein, known as Top7, with an entirely novel fold.

Although primarily known for the development of methods for computational prediction of protein structure and function, he is also interested in the use of computational methods to drive experimental assessment of biology; his laboratory maintains an active experimental biochemistry group. He also served on the Life Sciences jury for the Infosys Prize in 2016.

Appearances 
In December 2018, Baker spoke at the "Antibody Engineering and Therapeutics" conference in San Diego, California.

In April 2019, Baker gave a TED talk titled "5 challenges we could solve by designing new proteins" at TED2019 in Vancouver, Canada.

References

External links
David Baker online talk: "Crowd Sourcing Protein Folding: Rosetta@Home and FoldIt"
David Baker online seminar: "Introduction to Protein Design"
David Baker online seminar: "Design of New Protein Functions"

American biochemists
Overton Prize winners
American bioinformaticians
Living people
1962 births
Fellows of the American Academy of Arts and Sciences
University of Washington faculty
Howard Hughes Medical Investigators
Members of the United States National Academy of Sciences
University of California, San Francisco alumni